Benji: Off the Leash! is a 2004 American comedy-drama film directed, written, and produced by Joe Camp. It stars Nick Whitaker, Chris Kendrick, Christy Summerhays, Randall Newsome, Duane Stephens, and animal actors. It is the fifth film in the Benji series, and the last Benji film that Joe Camp has directed, produced, and written.

Plot

The film starts with the understanding that the makers of the Benji films are going to various towns in the U.S. looking for the next dog to play Benji. In a small Mississippi town, a freelance, abusive dog breeder named Hatchett keeps a backyard kennel under poor conditions behind his home. He lives with a young boy named Colby and his mother and is verbally and physically abusive to them, but Colby loves dogs and secretly nurtures a female black dog, Daisy, who is Hatchett's top breeder.  He goes to an abandoned house in the neighborhood and takes food and water to the black dog so she can produce milk for her new pups.  Hatchett learns of this and accuses Colby of stealing his most prized breeder, then orders Colby to take the black puppies, but abandons a fluffy, light-colored "mongrel". Over several months, Colby secretly cares for the puppy, and he grows into the unnamed fluffy dog that will become Benji.

Meanwhile, two Animal Control officers named Livingston and Sheldon attempt to investigate Hatchett for his illegal breeding activities and reports of animal abuse by snooping outside his property. They come across a shaggy dog that is impossible to catch and dub him "Lizard Tongue" due to his long tongue. He seemingly taunts them by following them everywhere they go.

One day, the fluffy dog (Benji) wanders off to the front door of a local elderly man, Zachariah Finch, and eats a portion of meat inside a grocery bag that was left by a delivery boy on his front porch. Zachariah discovers the deed afterwards, and decides to leave out the unfinished portion to his mysterious guest. This became the norm and fluffy dog and Lizard Tongue would come at night to eat the food that Zachariah had left out. Seeing that Lizard Tongue needed a home, fluffy dog intervenes and orchestrates for Zachariah to discover that Lizard Tongue was the mysterious animal visiting him each night. Having already being attached to him, the old man takes the dog into his home.

When the fluffy dog sees that her mother is sick back at the kennel, he opens her cage and helps her escape. He brings her back to the abandoned house but when she became too sick to even eat, he gets Lizard Tongue to help him draw the animal control officers to the abandoned house. At the shelter, a veterinarian determines she is dying from over-breeding and poor care, so the shelter director and the local sheriff authorize the vet to spay the dog and perform life-saving surgery.

Hatchett becomes furious when he learns that his black dog was spayed and threatens to sue. But when he learns that the Benji film producer is in town and wants the fluffy dog to be the new Benji, he intimidates and forces Colby into lying about being the owner. At the shelter, the fluffy dog is reunited with her mother, and Colby tells everyone the truth about the dog. Ozzie also discovers signs of physical abuse on Colby's mother and Mr. Hatchett gets arrested while trying to flee. Colby says that while he loves fluffy dog so much, he wants him to have a better life as the new Benji. He only asks that he be allowed to visit him once in a while, to which the film producer replies that he could visit him anytime he wants. The end credits show various scenes from the film as they were shot and make reference to the origins of the shelter dogs used in the film.

Cast
Nick Whitaker as Colby, the son of Hatchett and Claire
Chris Kendrick as Terrance Muncy Hatchett, Colby's abusive father
Christy Summerhays as Claire, the wife of Hatchett and the mother of Colby
Neal Barth as Zachariah Finch, a local elderly man
Randall Newsome as Livingston, an animal control officer
Duane Stephens as Sheldon, an animal control officer
Nate Bynum as Sgt. Oswald Lewis
Melinda Haynes as Animal Shelter Director
Joey Miyashima as Veterinarian
Scott Wilkenson as Film Producer
Jeff Olson as Paul's Market owner
Moochie (credited as "Benji") as Benji, a white fluffy dog
Sally Sue as 8-Week-Old Benji
Odola as 4-Month-Old Benji
Shaggy as Lizard Tongue, a long-tongued shaggy dog
Gypsy the Cockatoo as Merlin

Production
As stated in the end credits, Benji: Off the Leash! was filmed in the Utah cities of Kaysville, Ogden, Payson, and Salt Lake City. The credits also jokingly refer to the number of computer-generated imagery effects and animatronic dogs used in the film as "none".

Reception
Benji: Off the Leash! received a score of 33% on Rotten Tomatoes, based on 43 reviews, with an average score of 4.3/10.

References

External links

2004 films
2004 comedy-drama films
Benji
Films shot in Utah
GoodTimes Entertainment
Universal Pictures
American comedy-drama films
Films directed by Joe Camp
2000s English-language films
2000s American films